The grey warbler (Gerygone igata), also known by its Māori name  or outside New Zealand as the grey gerygone, is an insectivorous bird in the family Acanthizidae endemic to New Zealand. Its natural habitat is temperate forests. It is sometimes known as the teetotum or rainbird.

Description
One of the smallest birds found in New Zealand, grey warblers are about 11 centimeters long, with a weight of up to 6.5 grams. It has grey-brown plumage (with a slight olive-green tint), with the face, throat and breast being pale-grey. The abdomen is off-white with a slight yellow tinge. The tail is white underneath and dark brown on top with white tips being visible in flight. They also have a distinctive ruby-red eye. Females are typically smaller than the male, but otherwise there is little sexual dimorphism. The young are paler with no hint of yellow and have brown eyes.

Song 
The male's song often starts with a series of three squeaks and builds into a distinctive long plaintive wavering trill that rises and falls. They sing throughout the year but most vigorously when nesting, during spring. Grey warblers are often heard more than they are seen.

Distribution and habitat
Grey warblers are common throughout New Zealand's main islands and many off-shore islands, but are absent from open country and alpine areas. At home in native and exotic forests it may be found almost anywhere there is some tree or shrub cover.

Behaviour

Diet
Grey warblers mainly feed upon spiders, insects and their larvae. They are very active, and almost never stay still as they move from one perch to another.

Nesting

Grey warblers are unique among New Zealand birds in building a pear-shaped nest with a side entrance near the top. The male collects nesting material, but the female builds the nest from grass, leaves, rootlets and moss, held together with spider web threads, anywhere from 2 to 25 feet above the ground, lined with feathers and other soft material. It is attached to a twig at the top, but is often also secured at the back or sides. The male is not involved in nest building or incubation, but helps to feed nestlings and fledglings. The 3 to 6 eggs, each laid 2 days apart, are pinkish-white with fine reddish-brown speckles all over. The eggs, weighing 1.5 g are about 17 mm long and 12 mm wide. Incubation takes about 19 days and the chicks spend another 15 to 19 days in the nest.

Their breeding season is from August to January and they usually manage two clutches. The shining bronze cuckoo, a brood parasite, often targets the second clutch.

In Māori culture 
The direction in which a grey warbler would build its nest served as an indicator of forthcoming weather conditions to Māori – in this respect, the bird was known as a manu tohu tau. The tradition states that a grey warbler will build the nest entrance in the opposite direction to the prevailing wind. As such, a eastern-facing entrance would indicate a poorly season brought on by western winds; in contrast, a northern-facing entrance would suggest a pleasant season ahead.

In spring, the song of the grey warbler is said to be a signal for Māori to begin planting their crops. As such, those who 'ignore' the call of the grey warbler and do not help out with the planting of crops (and later seek to reap the harvest for themselves) are rebuked with the following whakataukī (proverb):

Gallery

References

 NZ Royal Forest and Bird Protection Society, Nov 2003 
 Gerygone Flaviventris. — (Grey Warbler.) | NZETC

grey warbler
Endemic birds of New Zealand
grey warbler
Taxonomy articles created by Polbot